Adamson is an English patronymic surname meaning "son of Adam". It is rare as a given name, although there has been a tradition in some families for the first-born son to be called Adam.  People with the surname Adamson include:

 Adam Adamson (1884–1984), New Zealand businessman
 Agar Adamson (1865–1929), Canadian Light Infantry officer 1916 to 1918
 Al Adamson (1925–1995), B-grade horror movie director
 Amandus Adamson (1855–1929), Estonian sculptor and painter
 Andrew Adamson (born 1966), New Zealand film director
 Anthony Adamson (1906–2002), Canadian architect, author, teacher and municipal politician
 Barry Adamson (born 1958), English rock musician
 Bartlett Adamson, (1884–1951), Australian author
 Callum Adamson, British businessman and musician
 Campbell Adamson (1922–2000), British industrialist
 Carey Adamson (1942–2019), Royal New Zealand Air Force officer
 Charlie Adamson (1875–1918), English rugby union player
 Chris Adamson (born 1978), English footballer
 Christine Adamson (born 1962/1963), Australian judge
 Christopher Adamson (actor) (born 1956), British actor
 Clare Adamson (born 1968), Member of Scottish Parliament
 Daniel Adamson (1820–1890), English engineer
 David B. Adamson (1823–1891), farm implement manufacturer and inventor in South Australia
 Derick Adamson (born 1958), Jamaican marathon runner
 Donald Adamson (born 1939), British author and historian
 Edward Adamson (1911–1996), British artist and pioneer of Art Therapy
 Frances Adamson (born 1961), Australian public servant, diplomat, 36th Governor of South Australia
 George Adamson (1906–1989), Indian-born wildlife conservationist and author
 George Lucas Adamson, founder of Adamson University
 George Worsley Adamson (1913–2005), American and British illustrator and author
 Grant Adamson, Australian rugby league player
 Harold Adamson (1906–1980), American lyricist
 Harry Adamson (born 1913), English footballer
 Harvey Adamson (1854–1941), Lieutenant Governor of Burma
 Hendrik Adamson (1891–1946), Estonian poet
 Henry Adamson, (1581–1637), Scottish poet and historian
 Hugh Adamson, Scottish footballer who played for Bolton Wanderers and Everton
 Ian Adamson (1944–2019), Irish politician and medical doctor
 Isaac Adamson (born 1971), American author
 Jack Adamson (1873–1937), Australian rules footballer
 Jack H. Adamson (1918–1975), American academic
 James B. Adamson, American businessman
 James Bradshaw Adamson (1921–2003), General in U.S. Army
 James C. Adamson (born 1946), astronaut
 James Hazel Adamson (1829–1902), South Australian inventor and artist
 Janet Adamson (1882–1962), Scottish politician
 Jean Adamson (born 1928), British children's writer and illustrator
 Jim Adamson (born 1905), Australian rules footballer
 Jimmy Adamson (born 1929), English professional footballer
 Jimmy Adamson (Scottish footballer), Scottish footballer
 John Adamson (disambiguation), multiple people
 John William Adamson (1857–1949), British educationist
 Joy Adamson (1910–1980), Czech-born British naturalist and author
 Julia Adamson (born 1960), Canadian-born British composer
 Ken Adamson (born 1938), American footballer
 Lawrence Adamson (1860–1932), Australian schoolmaster
 Lee Adamson (born 1946), Australian rules footballer
 Maggie Adamson, Scottish musician
 Matt Adamson (born 1972), Australian rugby league player
 Mike Adamson (footballer) (born 1949), Scottish footballer
 Sarah Gough Adamson (1888–1963), British artist
 Shpongle born Michele Adamson, rave and trance DJ
 Nej Adamson (born 1958), British actor
 Nicolas Clark Adamson (born 1938), Royal courtier
 Patrick Adamson (1537–1592), Scottish prelate
 Peter Adamson (politician) (born 1961), Lord Mayor of Darwin
 Peter Adamson (actor) (1930–2002), British actor
 Peter Adamson (academic) (born 1972), professor of philosophy
 Phil Adamson, Australian rugby league player
 Raymond Adamson (1920–2002), British actor
 Robert Adamson (disambiguation)
 Stephen Adamson, politician
 Stuart Adamson (1958–2001), British rock musician
 Thomas Adamson (priest) (1926–1991)
 Thomas Adamson (disambiguation)
 Tom Adamson, Scottish footballer who played for Brentford and Bury
 Tommy Adamson, Scottish footballer who played for Dundee United and Forfar Athletic
 William Adamson (1863–1936), Leader of the British Labour Party
 William Adamson (Wisconsin politician) (1834–1907), American politician
 William Agar Adamson (1800–1868), Canadian clergyman and author
 William C. Adamson (1854–1929), American politician from Georgia
 William Murdoch Adamson (1881–1945), British Labour politician
 Yilpi Adamson (born 1954), Australian artist

Notes 

English-language surnames
Patronymic surnames
Surnames from given names